Willingen (official name: Willingen (Upland)) is a municipality in Waldeck-Frankenberg in northern Hesse, Germany, some 80 km west of Kassel.

Geography

Location
Willingen is found in Waldeck-Frankenberg district in the Upland. Its main town stretches between two river valleys, the Hoppecke in the west and the Itter in the east. The ski resort Skigebiet Willingen is near. It is located 60 km west of Kassel. Mühlenkopfschanze ski jump is also located here.

Neighbouring communities
Willingen borders in the north on the community of Diemelsee, in the east on the town of Korbach, in the south on the community of Medebach, and in the west on the towns of Winterberg, Olsberg and Brilon (all three in the Hochsauerlandkreis in North Rhine-Westphalia).

Constituent communities

Willingen consists of the following centres:
 Bömighausen, 300 inhabitants (as of 1 September 2003)
 Eimelrod, 582 inhabitants  (as of 31. December 2006)
 Hemmighausen, 100 inhabitants
 Neerdar, 100 inhabitants
 Rattlar, 400 inhabitants
 Schwalefeld, 900 inhabitants
 Usseln, 2,100 inhabitants
 Welleringhausen, 100 inhabitants
 Willingen, 3,500 inhabitants

History
Willingen was founded in 1874 in the second municipal reform by uniting the villages of Bömighausen, Eimelrod, Hemmighausen, Neerdar, Rattlar, Schwalefeld, Welleringhausen and the climatic spas of Usseln and Willingen. Until 1929, Willingen belonged to the Free State of Waldeck, after which it passed to Prussia.

Politics

Municipal council
Willingen's council is made up of 31 councillors, with seats apportioned thus, in accordance with municipal elections held on 6 March 2016:

Note: FWG is a citizens' coalition.

Coat of arms
The field is parted horizontally, below the middle, by a row of interlocking arrows between the gold above and the green below. It is meant, of course, to look like treetops, and refers to the Upland's extensive woods. There are two charges, one inside the other. The eight-pointed black star is the ubiquitous – in terms of the local civic heraldry – Star of Waldeck, borne centuries ago by the Counts of Waldeck when they held sway over the area. The snowflake is included as a charge within the star and is representative of the community's status as a winter resort.

The community was granted this coat of arms on 12 June 1974.

Culture and sightseeing

Willingen's landmark is the great railway bridge, "Das Viadukt", built about 1918. The community thrives mainly on tourism. There were 1.3 million overnight stays in 2003, and attractions include winter sports and bowling clubs.

Regular events
Among Willingen's sports events are the International Ski Federation's annual FIS Ski Jumping World Cup competition at the Mühlenkopfschanze, and the annual Mountainbike-Event at the Ettelsberg. Nearby lie the trails of Bike Arena Sauerland.

Transport
Willingen lies on the Uplandbahn railway line between Korbach and Brilon-Wald.

Gallery

Notable people 
 Stephan Leyhe (born 1992), ski jumper

 Jochen Behle (born 1960), former cross-country skier and trainer in the cross-country skiing, lives in the district Schwalefeld and started for the SC Willingen
 Tobias Lindner (born 1961), former biathlete, grew up in Willingen and started for SC Willingen
 Klaus Huber (born 1968), former ski jumping, ski jumping trainer at the SC Willingen
 Petra Behle (born 1969), former biathlete, started for SC Willingen
 Anna Häfele (born 1989), ski jumping champion, started for SC Willingen

See also 
 Heringhausen (Diemelsee)

References

External links
 
 http://sites.google.com/site/photowithkalirajan/home/trip/germany/20090330

Waldeck-Frankenberg
Principality of Waldeck and Pyrmont